Foliatum, a Latin word meaning leafy, may refer to:
 Anthurium scherzerianum var. foliatum, a flowering plant variety in the species Anthurium scherzerianum and the genus Anthurium
 Ceratostoma foliatum, a species of medium to large sea snail
 Heliotropium foliatum, a flowering plant species in the genus Heliotropium
 Murphydium foliatum, a spider species in the genus Murphydium and the family Linyphiidae

See also
 Foliata (disambiguation)
 Foliatus (disambiguation)